Kulthida Yenprasert, nicknamed Neng is a flight attendant for Thai Airways International and Miss Thailand Universe 2000 titleholder.

Biography
Yenprasert was born and raised in Bangkok by her mother and stepfather.

She attended Faculty of Architecture, Chulalongkorn University, one of Thailand's most prestigious universities in Bangkok.

Pageantry
She was notable for winning the title of Miss Thailand Universe 2000 in Bangkok, Thailand and her following participation in the Miss Universe pageant held at Eleftheria Stadium, Nicosia, Cyprus on May 12, 2000, but did not place.  The event was won by Lara Dutta of India.

Facts/Trivia
 She was the first Thai woman ever crowned Miss Thailand Universe. 
 There are 3 main titles for Thai's beauty queen: Miss Thailand Universe, Miss Thailand World & Naang-Sao-Thai (Miss Thailand)

External links
Crowning Moment
The Majestic World of Beauty Pageant

1980 births
Kulthida Yenprasert
Kulthida Yenprasert
Flight attendants
Living people
Miss Universe 2000 contestants
Kulthida Yenprasert
Kulthida Yenprasert